Vansittart is a surname of Dutch origin, derived from the city of Sittard in Limburg. Notable people with the surname include:

Augustus Arthur Vansittart (1824–1882), English scholar
Cyril Vansittart (1852–1887), English-Italian chess player
Edward Vansittart Neale (1810–1892), English barrister
George Henry Vansittart (1768–1824), British army general
George Vansittart (1745–1825), British politician
Henrietta Vansittart (1833–1883), English engineer and inventor
Henry Vansittart (1732–1770), English diplomat and Governor of Bengal
Nicholas Vansittart, 1st Baron Bexley (1766–1851), English politician
Peter Vansittart (1920–2008), English writer
Robert Vansittart (judge) (1728–1789), English jurist
Robert Vansittart, 1st Baron Vansittart (1881–1957), English diplomat
Rupert Vansittart (born 1958), English actor
Sir Vansittart Bowater, 1st Baronet (1862–1938), English politician
Tom Vansittart (born 1950), English retired footballer
William Vansittart (1813–1878), British politician
William Vansittart Bowater (1838–1907), English businessman

See also
Vansittart (ship)
Vansittart (1814 ship), launched at New York in 1807, under another name
HMS Vansittart (D64), Admiralty modified W class destroyer of the Royal Navy
Vansittart (East Indiaman)
Vansittart Island (Nunavut), uninhabited Canadian arctic island
Vansittart Island (Tasmania), island in Australia

References

Dutch-language surnames
Surnames of Dutch origin
Dutch toponymic surnames